Yongma Land is a small abandoned amusement park in Yongmasan, Jungnang District, Seoul, South Korea. It operated from 1980 to 2011.

History
Yongma Land opened in 1980 as a family-friendly amusement park. Yongma Land was a popular location for local families for the first decade after it opened. However, when Lotte World opened in 1989, people lost interest in the smaller Yongma Land. The park was renovated in 1995, with new attractions added. The park officially ceased operation in 2011 after the city revoked their license. 

Rides in the park included a carousel, bumper cars, and an octopus-themed ride.

Present Day 
Though it is no longer operating as an amusement park, the area continues to attract about 50 to 60 visitors each day, such as urban explorers, cosplayers, photographers, and professionals in the video production industries. The current owner of the property allows visitors for a small fee. Money collected from visitor fees allows the owner to maintain arrested decay in the park.

Several television shows have filmed at the park, including Cafe Minamdang, Heartless City, and Sisyphus: The Myth. K-pop group Crayon Pop and singer Baek Ji-young have used the park for music videos.

References 

Buildings and structures in Jungnang District
Amusement parks in South Korea
1980 establishments in South Korea
2011 disestablishments in South Korea
Defunct amusement parks
Amusement parks opened in 1980
Amusement parks closed in 2011
Modern ruins
20th-century architecture in South Korea